Little River Band is the debut studio album by the Australian rock group Little River Band which was released by EMI in October 1975. It peaked at No. 17 on the Australian Kent Music Report Albums Chart and was certified 2× gold in Australia in November 1976.

Singles
The band's first single, "Curiosity (Killed the Cat)", was released in September 1975, ahead of the album and peaked at No. 15 on the Kent Music Report Singles Chart. The following single, "Emma" was released in December 1975 and peaked at No. 20.

In August 1976, an edited version of "It's a Long Way There" was released as the band lead single international and the third single in Australia. It reached the Australian Top 40 and became the band's first US Top 40 hit. It also charted in Netherlands to reach No. 14.

"I'll Always Call Your Name" was release in early 1977 in North America only as the album's fourth and final single.

Track listing
All tracks are written by Little River Band members as shown.

Personnel
Little River Band members
Beeb Birtles – lead vocals, backing vocals, guitars (acoustic, electric)
Ric Formosa – guitars (lead, acoustic, slide)
Graham Goble – lead vocals, backing vocals, guitars (acoustic, electric), vocal arrangements
Roger McLachlan – bass guitar
Derek Pellicci – drums, percussion
Glenn Shorrock – lead vocals, backing vocals, percussion, harmonica

Additional musicians
Stephen Cooney – clavinet (track 2), mandolin (track 9)
Gary Hyde – percussion
Peter Jones – strings (arrangement, conductor), piano (tracks 1–5, 7–9)
Col Loughnan – saxophone (track 8)
Ian Mason – piano (track 6)

Production details
Engineering – Ross Cockle (recording and remix), Mark Opitz (mastering)
Producer – Birtles, Shorrock, Glenn Wheatley, Goble
Design – Art Sims

Charts

Certifications

References 

1975 debut albums
Little River Band albums
EMI Records albums
Harvest Records albums